Hell's Doorway is an adventure novel by Australian author F. J. Thwaites.

Plot
Vallance Hunter is a Sydney medical student whose mother is dying of cancer. Vallance euthanizes her and is sent to prison. After two years, he escapes from Goulburn Gaol and goes to live on a cattle station in the Wolgan Valley run by a grazier and his daughter. He falls in love with the daughter and goes blind.

Background
Sales of the novel boomed after it was read out on 2UE radio. It sold over 27,000 copies.

Reception
The book critic in the Sydney Morning Herald said that "Mr Thwaites writes vigorously and extracts the last ounce of excitement from the sensational elements of his plot. His characters, however, appear to be somewhat unreal, probably because Mr Thwaites has not mastered the art of writing good dialogue, and because he is regrettably prone to sentimentality."

References

External links
Hell's Doorway at AustLit

1932 Australian novels
Australian adventure novels
Novels set in New South Wales
Novels set in prison